Manchester Airport Holdings Limited, trading as MAG (originally Manchester Airports Group) is a holding company which is owned by the ten metropolitan borough councils of Greater Manchester, in North West England, and Australian investment fund IFM Investors. Founded in 2001 MAG is the largest UK-owned airport operator, following the purchase of BAA by Ferrovial in 2006. MAG owns three British airports Manchester Airport, East Midlands Airport, and Stansted Airport. In the 2017/18 financial year, 58.9 million passengers used MAG airports.

Of the ten metropolitan boroughs of Greater Manchester, Manchester City Council holds the largest stake, at 35.5%. The remaining nine councils hold a total of 29%. IFM Investors own a 35.5% stake in MAG. The Group has its registered office at Manchester Town Hall. MAG operates on a commercial basis at arm's length from its public owners who only take a dividend from profits. This was £20 million in 2010 while MAG retained £80 million from the £100 million profit.

History
Manchester Airport opened in 1938 funded by Manchester Corporation, and has remained in public ownership ever since. It is the third-busiest airport in the United Kingdom after Heathrow and Gatwick, and is fractionally busier than Stansted (see Busiest airports in the United Kingdom by total passenger traffic). The M56 motorway was built to serve the airport in 1972, a rail station opened in 1993 and a second runway was completed in 1997.

In 1999, Manchester Airport bought Humberside Airport marking its arrival as an airport management company. In 2000, National Express put both East Midlands and Bournemouth Airport up for sale - both of which were sold for £241 million to MAG in 2001. Consequently, the councils of Greater Manchester saw it fit to create a dedicated holding company to manage this portfolio at arm's length. Manchester Airports Group was formed in 2001 to own and operate Manchester Airport and the other smaller acquisitions.

MAG runs airport service-related businesses including baggage handling and ground services, car parking, fire-fighting, airport security, engineering, motor transport services and advertising. The property and development arm of MAG, previously known as MADL (Manchester Airport Developments), was rebranded as MAG Developments in early 2009.

The Group reported 2007/08 profits of £96.5m and decided in 2008 to sell Humberside Airport after 9 years of ownership. However this decision was reversed later in the year following a surge in passenger numbers and little interest from potential bidders. However, MAG sold its 83.7% share of Humberside in 2012 for £2.3 million to Eastern Group who operate nearly half of all flights there amid a return to a general decline of passenger numbers for small regional airport and desire to focus on larger airports.

MAG in partnership with a Canadian pension fund and financial assets unsuccessfully bid for London Gatwick Airport, this followed a report by the Competition Commission into BAA's market dominance in London/South East England and Scotland forcing it to sell off some of its airports. MAG made a £1.4 billion offer to acquire Gatwick Airport in 2009. Originally BAA wanted £2 billion for the airport, but eventually came down to an asking price of £1.5 billion. However, MAG refused to arrange a further £100 million of finance and consequently pulled out of the race.

In January 2013 it was announced that MAG had agreed to purchase London Stansted Airport for £1.5 billion. The sale was completed on 28 February 2013.

In 2011 the proposed Airport City Manchester office and commercial space development abutting the airport became one of the Governments new low tax Enterprise Zones, the zones featured include World Logistics Hub to the south of the airport offering logistics and air freight, Airport City to the north of the airport offering office and high-tech manufacturing, MediPark around Wythenshawe Hospital for medical and clinical firms alongside several retail, office and business parks inside the town of Wythenshawe itself. The Group are focused on delivering the £659 million Manchester Airport City. Planning permission for the Airport City development was confirmed on 17 January 2013 and construction work is due to begin in February 2013. On 18 January 2013, it was announced that MAG would purchase Stansted Airport from Heathrow Airport Holdings for £1.5bn. IFM Investors purchased a 35.5% stake in MAG to help fund the takeover. The sale was completed on 28 February 2013.

Ownership
MAG is majority owned by the ten local authorities of Greater Manchester, with Manchester City Council owning 35.5%. The remaining nine authorities, the Metropolitan Boroughs of Bolton, Bury, Oldham, Rochdale, Stockport, Tameside, Trafford, Wigan, together with Salford City Council, collectively own 29%. In 2012, it was decided that rules on shareholding would be changed to allow external, private investors to purchase stakes in order to provide extra capital for future investment and takeovers of airports. Manchester City Council would retain a controlling stake over the organisation. To raise funds for the purchase of Stansted Airport, IFM Investors purchased a 35.5% share in the group.

Airports

MAG owns three airports in the United Kingdom (see Busiest airports in the United Kingdom by total passenger traffic).

References

External links

 
Aviation in England
Transport operators of England
Companies based in Manchester
Companies owned by municipalities of England
2001 establishments in England
Transport companies established in 2001
Manchester Airport